The members of the 28th General Assembly of Newfoundland were elected in the Newfoundland general election held in June 1932. The general assembly sat from 1932 to 1934.

The United Newfoundland Party led by Frederick C. Alderdice formed the government.

James A. Winter served as speaker.

Sir David Murray Anderson served as governor of Newfoundland.

Overwhelmed by debt, the government proposed that it would temporarily reduce its debt payments. Instead, Canada and Britain helped make payments on its debt while a royal commission of enquiry considered Newfoundland's political future. The report, delivered in November 1933, recommended the suspension of responsible government. A Commission of Government would administer Newfoundland until its finances improved and its people wanted a return to responsible government.

Members of the Assembly 
The following members were elected to the assembly in 1932:

By-elections 
None

References

External links 
 

Terms of the General Assembly of Newfoundland and Labrador